Schinkelplatz is a square in Berlin, Germany, named after Karl Friedrich Schinkel. 

On one side of the square stands the Bauakademie, under wraps waiting to be rebuilt, and on the other, the neo-Gothic Friedrichswerder Church. In front of both buildings, there is a statue of Schinkel. More recent buildings include a block of apartments, offices, shops and restaurants designed by Axel Schultes and Charlotte Frank; Rafael Moneo; and the firm Hemprich Tophof. 

The square also has statues of Albrecht Thaer and Christian Peter Wilhelm Beuth.

References

External links

 

Mitte
Squares in Berlin